Johnville F.C. may refer to:

 Johnville F.C. (Dublin) 
 Johnville F.C. (Waterford)